Macroglossum arimasi is a moth of the  family Sphingidae. It is known from the Philippines.

References

Macroglossum
Moths described in 1993